Bélâbre is a commune in the Indre department in central France.  It is the site of the Gallic city of Vosagum during the era of the Roman Empire's domination of this part of western  Gaul (France).

Geography
The commune is located in the parc naturel régional de la Brenne.

The river Anglin flows northwest through the commune and crosses the village.

Population

See also
Communes of the Indre department

References

Communes of Indre
County of La Marche